Me, Too, in the Mafia is a 1974 Danish comedy film directed by Henning Ørnbak and starring Dirch Passer.

Cast

 Dirch Passer – Victor 'Viffer' Hansen
 Freddy Albeck – Don Luigi
 Jytte Abildstrøm – Donna Elvira
 Dick Kaysø – Dino
 Per Goldschmidt – Carlo
 Poul Glargaard – Emilio Costello
 Preben Kaas – Valde Sørensen
 Axel Strøbye – Olfert
 Lone Hertz – Dafne
 Preben Mahrt – Sheik Abdul
 Henrik Wiehe – Abduls tolk
 Bertel Lauring – Julius / 'Sildehajen'
 Jens Østerholm – Eddy 'Trigger' Brown
 Finn Nielsen – Kenneth
 Vera Gebuhr – Danselærerinde
 Lene Maimu – Sygeplejerske
 Claus Nissen – Benny
 Lise Henningsen – Mafia pige
 Hans Christian Ægidius – Læge på skadestue
 Ulf Pilgaard – Overlæge Gudmund Brikse

External links

1974 films
1974 comedy films
Danish comedy films
1970s Danish-language films
Films directed by Henning Ørnbak